Geoffrey of Anjou may refer to:
Geoffrey I, Count of Anjou (died 987), reigned 958–987, called Greymantle, succeeded his father Fulk II
Geoffrey II, Count of Anjou, reigned 1040–1060, succeeded his father Fulk III
Geoffrey III, Count of Anjou, reigned 1060–1068, called the Bearded, succeeded his uncle Geoffrey II
Geoffrey IV, Count of Anjou (died 1106), reigned 1098–1106 with his father Fulk IV, assassinated
Geoffrey V, Count of Anjou (1113–1151), reigned 1129–1151, called the Handsome and Plantagenet, later Duke of Normandy, father of Henry II of England